Hagnagora is a genus of moths in the family Geometridae erected by Herbert Druce in 1885.

Species
buckleyi clade
Hagnagora buckleyi Druce, 1885
Hagnagora catagrammina Druce, 1885
Hagnagora lex Druce, 1885
anicata clade
Hagnagora anicata (Felder & Rogenhofer, 1875)
Hagnagora elianne Sullivan, 2011
Hagnagora unnia Sullivan, 2011
Hagnagora marionae Brehm and Sullivan, 2005
Hagnagora richardi Brehm, 2015
Hagnagora hedwigae Brehm, 2015
croceitincta clade
Hagnagora croceitincta (Dognin, 1892)
Hagnagora clustimena (Druce, 1893)
Hagnagora mirandahenrichae Brehm, 2015
mortipax clade
Hagnagora mortipax (Butler, 1872)
Hagnagora jamaicensis (Schaus, 1901)
Hagnagora acothysta (Schaus, 1901)
Hagnagora guatica (Schaus, 1927)
ephestris clade
Hagnagora ephestris (Felder & Rogenhofer, 1875)
Hagnagora discordata (Guenée [1858])
Hagnagora luteoradiata (Thierry-Mieg, 1892)
subrosea clade
Hagnagora subrosea (Warren, 1909)

Species excluded from Hagnagora
"Hagnagora" ignipennis (Dognin, 1913)
"Hagnagora" mesenata (Felder & Rogenhofer, 1875)
"Hagnagora" vittata (Philippi, 1859)

References

Larentiinae